Wing Commander Ashis Roy, MD FRCS (born 1 June 1932) is a runner, author, and cardiologist best known as the first Indian man to run 100 marathons. As of 2015, he has completed 145 total races, 115 of which are full marathons.

Biography
Roy was born 1 June 1932 in Shillong, Meghalaya, India, the son of sports player and organizer Sudha Sindhu Roy. He graduated from the Government Boys' High School in Mawkhar, then attended St. Edmund's College, Assam Medical College (Medical Studies), and Pune University (MD) He joined the Indian Air Force in 1957 and served as a Wing Commander until 1978, when he retired after 21 years of service. After leaving the military, he became a consulting physician and cardiologist in Chittaranjan Park, Delhi.

His daughter Amrita sometimes joins him for races in the US, where she lives. He has another daughter who lives in Canada and a son who lives in London.

Running
Roy's first competitive race was a one-mile run in 1949 when he was 16. He did not run a marathon until the Rath Marathon in Delhi in 1985 after he left the Air Force. Some of the races he has run include the World Veterans Games (1987) in Melbourne, Australia, the 100th Boston Marathon (1996) in the US, the Millennium Marathon Burlington (2000) in Canada, the Self-Transcendence 3100 Mile Race (2008) in the US, and the Rock 'n' Roll Half Marathon (2015) in Chicago, Illinois, USA.

On 17 January 2010, he became the first person from India to run 100 marathons and was the first Indian ever to join the 100 Marathon Club, which he did in 2015. In 2013, when he was 81 and had run 115 races, he was listed in the Limca Book of Records as the oldest marathoner in India. Roy began running only half marathons after a spinal injury in 2011  left him partially paralyzed.

Publications
Joy of Running (2009)
Wonderful Joys of Running (2014)

Full marathons run

Achievements

References

1932 births
Living people
Indian male marathon runners
Indian male long-distance runners
People from Shillong
Indian Air Force officers
Sportspeople from Meghalaya
Indian cardiologists
Indian medical doctors
Indian Air Force personnel
Medical doctors from Delhi
Athletes from Delhi